Victoria Davey Spelling (born May 16, 1973) is an American actress and author. Her first major role was Donna Martin on Beverly Hills, 90210, beginning in 1990. She has appeared in made for television films, including A Friend to Die For (1994), A Carol Christmas (2003), The Mistle-Tones (2012), both versions of Mother, May I Sleep with Danger? (1996 and 2016) and The Last Sharknado: It's About Time (2018). She has also starred in several independent films including The House of Yes (1997), Trick (1999), Scary Movie 2 (2001), Cthulhu (2007), Kiss the Bride (2007) and Izzie's Way Home (2016). She reprised her role of Donna Martin in Beverly Hills, 90210 spin-off, BH90210, in 2019.

Spelling's autobiography, Stori Telling, debuted on top of the New York Times Best Seller list and was awarded the title of best celebrity autobiography of 2009.

Early life
Spelling was born in Los Angeles, California. She is the daughter of Candy Spelling (née Marer; born 1945) and television and film producer Aaron Spelling (1923–2006). She has a younger brother, Randy, a former actor who, works as a life coach. Spelling's parents were from Jewish families whose ancestors moved to the United States from Russia and Poland. Her middle name comes from her paternal grandfather, David. She attended Beverly Hills High School in Beverly Hills, California, and graduated from the elite private school Harvard-Westlake School in 1991.

Career

Early work
At age six, Spelling was given acting lessons from an acting coach hired by her father, and was subsequently given guest spots on television series such as The Love Boat, T. J. Hooker, Hotel, Fantasy Island, Vega$ and Saved by the Bell. At the age of 17, she was given the role of Donna Martin on Beverly Hills, 90210, co-produced by Aaron Spelling's company Spelling Television. Tori Spelling portrayed Donna for the show's entire run and was nominated for two Young Artist Awards.

While starring on Beverly Hills, 90210, Spelling was cast in a number of made-for-television films, including Co-ed Call Girl (1996), A Friend to Die For (1994), and Mother, May I Sleep with Danger? (1996), and several independent films, including The House of Yes (1997) and Trick (1999).

2006–2009
In 2006, Spelling starred as herself in the VH1 sitcom So Notorious, which parodied her public image. In January 2007, she and her second husband Dean McDermott pretended to purchase and operate a bed and breakfast hotel, Chateau La Rue in Fallbrook, California for their reality series, Tori & Dean: Home Sweet Hollywood, originally Tori & Dean: Inn Love, which aired on Oxygen from 2007 to 2012. In July 2007, Spelling became a minister to marry a gay couple at Chateau La Rue. A tape of the wedding ceremony was shown on Inn Love.

Spelling's fashion and jewelry line premiered on HSN. She released her autobiography, sTori TELLING, on March 11, 2008. Her second book, Mommywood, was released on April 14, 2009.

On January 7, 2009, it was reported that Spelling would reprise her role as Donna Martin on Beverly Hills, 90210 spin-off 90210. She appeared in the nineteenth and twentieth episodes of the first season as a special guest star.

2010–present
In 2010, Spelling released her third book, Uncharted TerriTORI. Spelling told People: "I love sharing my stories and experiences with people and connecting to them on both a humorous and emotional level. The response to my first two books has been so amazing that I wanted to write a third one for my fans."

Home Sweet Hollywood's spin-off series, Tori & Dean: sTORIbook Weddings premiered on April 6, 2011. Writers, who claimed they came up with the idea of a similar series starring Spelling and husband Dean McDermott, filed a $60 million lawsuit against the series, citing breach of implied-in-fact contract, breach of fiduciary duty, slander of title, false advertising, and unfair business practices among other charges.  Later in 2011, Spelling voiced the Pirate Princess in Jake and the Never Land Pirates. She played a role in the comedy short film Hoarders: Untold sTori which premiered at the Outfest Film Festival in July 2011.

On September 4, 2011, Spelling made an appearance on Big Brother 13.

On April 21, 2012, Spelling hosted My Little Pony: Friendship Is Magic 'Royal Wedding' special, celebrating the series' second-season finale, called A Canterlot Wedding. She also hosted the series premiere of Craft Wars, where three new contestants each episode battle against each other crafting for a chance to earn $10,000.

On December 18, 2012, Spelling appeared on Nick Jr.'s Yo Gabba Gabba! and performed a skit where she baked cookies for the characters on the show. This was part of a Christmas special for the series. The special included other famous guests such as Tony Hawk and My Chemical Romance.

It was announced on August 26, 2013, that production had started on a reality television series titled Tori & Dean: Cabin Fever. The series chronicles Spelling, McDermott, and their four children as they move to a lakeside cabin in Ontario, Canada while renovating it into their vacation home. Eight half-hour episodes were produced and aired on CMT Canada and HGTV in 2014.

Spelling starred in the short-lived ABC Family TV series Mystery Girls with former 90210 co-star Jennie Garth in 2014.

In 2016, Spelling voiced April in the animated movie Izzie's Way Home. The same year, she co-starred in the TV movie Mother, May I Sleep with Danger? alongside James Franco.

Since June 24, 2018, Spelling is hosting the TV series The Look: All Stars. In the same time, she appears in the successful TV movie The Last Sharknado: It's About Time.

On January 30, 2019, Spelling competed in The Masked Singer as "Unicorn".

In November 2020, Spelling began a podcast with Beverly Hills 90210 co-star Jennie Garth titled 9021OMG, where the two re-watch and share memories from their time on the show and chat about their experiences, along with TV and radio personality Sisanie Villaclara.

On August 24, 2022, Spelling competed for one-night only on The Masked Singer Australia  as "Poodle".

Personal life
On July 3, 2004, Spelling married actor and writer Charlie Shanian. In July 2005, Spelling was filming the Lifetime TV-movie Mind Over Murder in Ottawa, during which she met actor Dean McDermott, who was then married to actress Mary Jo Eustace. Spelling and McDermott began an affair the night they met.  Spelling and Shanian separated in October 2005. Shanian cited irreconcilable differences when he filed for divorce, which was finalized on April 20, 2006.

Spelling married McDermott less than a month later, on May 7, 2006, in a private ceremony in Wakaya, Fiji. Spelling and McDermott renewed their vows on May 8, 2010, in Beverly Hills, California. The couple have five children together: three sons, Liam Aaron (born March 13, 2007), Finn Davey (born August 30, 2012) and Beau Dean (born March 2, 2017) and two daughters, Stella Doreen (born June 9, 2008) and Hattie Margaret (born October 10, 2011). She is also the stepmother to Jack Montgomery McDermott (born October 10, 1998), who is McDermott's son with Eustace. However, according to recent Instagram posts, Tori Spelling refers to Mary Jo Eustace’s daughter, Lola Eustace (born July 7, 2005), as her “step daughter”. Also, Lola Eustace refers to Dean McDermott as her “dad”, which would make Tori the stepmother to two children, Jack McDermott and Lola Eustace. 

Spelling anticipated a sizable inheritance from her father's $500 million estate after his death in 2006. The estate was to be divided primarily between Spelling, her brother Randy, and their mother Candy. Candy Spelling was the estate executor, but she and Tori Spelling were estranged. Tori and Randy Spelling each inherited $800,000, although Randy was not estranged from Candy. Candy established a $10 million trust fund for Tori's eldest child.

In her sixth book, Spelling It Like It Is, Spelling admitted to having financial troubles, due to the cancellation of her reality series, poor real estate decisions, and a difficult fourth pregnancy, during which she was hospitalized for ten weeks. In explanation, Spelling said, "...as my real estate obsession persists, it's starting to look more compulsive. Moving is expensive, and I've put us in a precarious financial situation."

Spelling is an ordained minister with an online ministry.

2013 infidelity scandal and aftermath

In December 2013, after welcoming their second son, Us Weekly broke the news that McDermott was unfaithful to Spelling. The couple worked through the aftermath of the affair on a Lifetime series titled True Tori.

While Spelling and McDermott's marriage was back on track, the couple once again made headlines in 2016 for owing $39,000 to American Express in unpaid credit card bills. Candy, who was on good terms with her daughter, told TMZ at the time that she was helping out Spelling and her family financially.

In March 2018, Spelling and McDermott were in contact with the police three times over the course of nine days. On Thursday, March 1, McDermott called the police around 7:00 am to say that Spelling was going through some sort of mental breakdown. Per an LAPD spokesperson, the situation ended up being a “domestic incident” and that “no crime” was committed. Nearly a week later, on Wednesday, March 7, the Ventura County Sheriff's Office showed up at Spelling's doctor's office around 9:45 am because of her husband raising a concern. McDermott called the police to check up on his wife after she had left their house with one of their children and that he was worried about her well-being. The deputies located Spelling at the doctor's office, spoke to her and determined she and their kids were okay. Because no crime had been committed, no further action was taken. On Friday, March 9, Spelling and McDermott went out to dinner with their five children at the Black Bear Diner in Tarzana, California. However, the LAPD arrived at the restaurant and it appeared that the couple were having a serious conversation inside. Their meal was cut short when the family was escorted out the back of the restaurant. It was later reported that the reason the police were called to the diner was because the paparazzi would not allow them to eat in peace and for the safety of Spelling, McDermott and their children, they needed a police escort from the restaurant.

In February 2019, Spelling claimed they no longer had relationship problems, as they communicated.

In June 2021, it was reported that the couple's marriage had been in "trouble for over a year". They sparked split rumors after fans noticed that Spelling and McDermott stopped sharing photos of each other on social media, and both were seen out and about without their wedding rings on. A source told Us Weekly that things between the couple were "not great". Spelling appeared on Jeff Lewis' radio show, Jeff Lewis Live, on June 16, 2021, and revealed that she and McDermott don't sleep in the same bedroom anymore. On October 18, 2021, Spelling was spotted outside an attorney's office having a heated phone call, sparking more split rumors. She was seen holding a notebook that listed a 3 p.m. meeting with a lawyer and the topics of discussion included "assets", "support", and "custody."

As of June 2022, Spelling and McDermott are currently in the midst of a trial separation. A source has said that they have considered ending their marriage. “They know divorce will be expensive and it’s not something they’re willing to go through right now. They both feel trapped,” the source says. “Having kids makes it more difficult because they don’t want their children to be unhappy, yet at the same time, Tori has been unhappy for quite a while now. They truly are still together for their kids.”

Filmography

Film

Television

Discography

Guest appearances

Bibliography
Spelling has written six books. Three were published by Gallery Books, while one was published by Aladdin Books and another published by Simon Spotlight Entertainment.

 sTORI Telling (2008)
 Mommywood
 Uncharted TerriTORI (2010).
 Presenting Tallulah (2010)
 CelebraTORI (2012)
 Spelling It Like It Is (2013)

Awards and nominations

References

External links

1973 births
20th-century American actresses
21st-century American actresses
21st-century American women writers
Actresses from Los Angeles
American autobiographers
American child actresses
American film actresses
American jewelry designers
American people of Polish-Jewish descent
American people of Russian-Jewish descent
Beverly Hills High School alumni
American television actresses
American television writers
Jewish American actresses
Jewish American writers
Jewish women writers
Living people
Participants in American reality television series
Actresses from Beverly Hills, California
Writers from Los Angeles
Women autobiographers
Spelling family
Harvard-Westlake School alumni
American women non-fiction writers
21st-century American non-fiction writers
Screenwriters from California
American women television writers
21st-century American screenwriters
21st-century American Jews
People from Holmby Hills, Los Angeles
Women jewellers